Manuel Mateos (born 9 December 1950) is a Mexican weightlifter. He competed in the men's featherweight event at the 1968 Summer Olympics.

References

External links
 

1950 births
Living people
Mexican male weightlifters
Olympic weightlifters of Mexico
Weightlifters at the 1968 Summer Olympics
Sportspeople from Tampico, Tamaulipas
Pan American Games medalists in weightlifting
Pan American Games gold medalists for Mexico
Pan American Games silver medalists for Mexico
Pan American Games bronze medalists for Mexico
Weightlifters at the 1967 Pan American Games
20th-century Mexican people
21st-century Mexican people